CDO is a command line suite for manipulating and analysing climate data. It provides more than 600 operators for this purpose and is an acronym for Climate Data Operators.

Supported data formats are:
 netCDF 3/4
 GRIB 1/2
 SERVICE
 EXTRA 
 IEG

Scripting interfaces 
CDO offers a scripting interface for Ruby and Python.

References

External links 
 Official Homepage
 Documentation

Meteorological data and networks
Climatology